Allen Ruppersberg (born 1944) is an American conceptual artist based in Los Angeles and New York City.

He is one of the first generation of American conceptual artists that changed the way art was thought about and made. His work includes paintings, prints, photographs, sculptures, installations and books.

Early life and education 
Born in Cleveland, Ohio, Ruppersberg graduated in 1967 with a Bachelor of Fine Arts degree from the Chouinard Art Institute (now the California Institute of the Arts) in Los Angeles, California.

Career
During his early years in Los Angeles, he began significant relationships with John Baldessari, William Leavitt, Ed Ruscha, William Wegman and Allan McCollum. He participated in the 1969 exhibition When Attitudes Become Form, and is recognized as a seminal practitioner of installation art, having produced works including Al's Cafe (1969), Al's Grand Hotel (1971) and The Novel that Writes Itself (1978).

He moved to New York in 1985.

Exhibitions
Since the late 1960s, his work has been the subject of over sixty solo exhibitions and nearly 200 group shows.

Career highlights include participation in:

 Documenta V (1972), Kassel, Germany
 Lyon Biennale (1997), Lyon, France
 Sculpture Project (1997), Münster, Germany
 Whitney Biennial (1970, 1975 and 1991), New York City, New York, United States

In 1985, the Museum of Contemporary Art, Los Angeles organized an exhibition of Ruppersberg's work, which subsequently traveled to the New Museum of Contemporary Art in New York City.

Exhibitions include:

 1997 Portikus, Frankfurt, Germany
 1998 Institute of Visual Arts, Milwaukee, Wisconsin, United States
 1999 Frac Limousin, Limoges, France (1999);

 2018 Walker Art Center, Minneapolis, United States
His work can be found in permanent collections of museums internationally, including:

 Foundation de Appel, Amsterdam, The Netherlands
 Museum für Moderne Kunst, Frankfurt, Germany
 Museum of Modern Art, New York City, New York, United States
 Museum of Contemporary Art, Los Angeles, Los Angeles, California, United States
 Whitney Museum of American Art, New York City, New York, United States

Artist's philosophy
Ruppersberg's philosophy is to use language as a means of expression in its own right. He drew on all the different sectors of the mass media and the consumer society from a critical viewpoint.

Works

 The New Five Foot Shelf. The installation consists of 50 books and 44 posters. Dimension of the installation: variable. Limited edition of 10 copies and 2 artist’s proofs. Produced and published in 2001 by Editions Micheline Szwajcer & Michèle Didier. Voir mfc-michèle didier
 "The New Five Foot Shelf of Books" installation, produced and published in 2003 by Editions Micheline Szwajcer and Michèle Didier, Brussels. Voir mfc-michèle didier
 "Chapter VI" artist book, produced and published in 2009 by mfc-michèle didier, Brussels

 The Novel That Writes Itself, artist book, produced and published in 2014 by mfc-michèle didier, Brussels

Awards
 United States Artists 2011 Oliver Fellow for Visual Arts

Personal life
Ruppersberg lives and works in Los Angeles and New York City. Ruppersburg is in a long term relationship for the past 12 years with Annette Leddy.

See also

 List of American artists 1900 and after
 List of California Institute of the Arts people

 List of painters by name
 List of people from Cleveland
 List of people from Los Angeles
 List of people from New York City
 List of photographers
 List of recent Whitney Biennial artists
 List of sculptors
 Visual art of the United States

References

Suggested reading
 Allen Ruppersberg: One of Many, by Allen Ruppersberg Publisher: Walther Konig, 2006
 Allen Ruppersberg: What One Loves About Life Are the Things That Fade, by Allan McCollum

External links
 Ruppersberg's work at The Museum of Modern Art, New York
 Ruppersberg's project at Dia Art Foundation
 Ruppersberg's work at Brooke Alexander Gallery
 Ruppersberg's profile at Kadist Art Foundation
 Cheryl Donegan, Allen Ruppersberg, interview in BOMB magazine, Oct 1, 2009

Date of birth missing (living people)
1944 births
20th-century American painters
American male painters
20th-century American sculptors
20th-century American male artists
21st-century American painters
21st-century American sculptors
21st-century American male artists
American male sculptors
Artists from Cleveland
Artists from Los Angeles
American conceptual artists
American contemporary painters
American installation artists
Chouinard Art Institute alumni
Conceptual photographers
Living people
Painters from California
Painters from New York City
Painters from Ohio
Photographers from California
Photographers from New York (state)
Postmodern artists
Sculptors from California
Sculptors from New York (state)
Sculptors from Ohio